Sai Kanakubo (金久保 彩, born January 11, 1989) is a Japanese football player who currently plays for Nara Club.

Club statistics
Updated to 18 November 2018.

References

External links
Profile at Vanraure Hachinohe

1989 births
Living people
Komazawa University alumni
Association football people from Ibaraki Prefecture
Japanese footballers
J2 League players
J3 League players
Japan Football League players
Mito HollyHock players
V-Varen Nagasaki players
AC Nagano Parceiro players
Kagoshima United FC players
Vanraure Hachinohe players
Nara Club players
Association football midfielders